Armagh (named after the city of Armagh) is a barony in County Armagh, Northern Ireland. It lies in the west of the county, bordering County Tyrone with its north-western boundary, and bordering the Republic of Ireland with its southern boundary. It is bordered by five other baronies in Northern Ireland: Tiranny to the west, Dungannon Middle to the north-west, Oneilland West to the north-east, Fews Lower to the east, and Fews Upper to the south-east. It also borders to the south the barony of Cremorne in the Republic of Ireland.

Geographical features
Some of the geographical features of Armagh barony include:
 Loughnashade
 Kinnegoe Bog
 Creaghan Stream
 Yellow Ford, where the Battle of the Yellow Ford took place in 1598

List of settlements
Below is a list of settlements in Armagh:

Towns
Armagh (also part in barony of Oneilland West)

Villages and population centres
Charlemont
Killevy
Milford

List of civil parishes
Below is a list of civil parishes in Armagh:
Armagh (split with barony of Oneilland West)
Clonfeacle (also partly in baronies of Dungannon Lower [one townland], Dungannon Middle and Oneilland West)
Eglish (split with barony of Tiranny)
Grange (split with barony of Oneilland West)
Keady (also partly in barony of Tiranny)
Lisnadill (split with baronies of Fews Lower and Fews Upper)
Loughgall (also partly in barony of Oneilland West)

References